Kabūdrāhang (also Romanized as Kabūd Rāhang, Kabood Rahang, and Kabūd Rāhang; also known as Kabūtarāhang) is a city and capital of Kabudarahang County, Hamadan Province, Iran. At the 2006 census, its population was 19,216, in 4,940 families.

References

Populated places in Kabudarahang County
Cities in Hamadan Province